Karpagavalli better known by her stage name Priya is an Indian actress who worked on South Indian movies. She was a prominent lead actress during the 1980s and 1990s in Malayalam films. She now works in Tamil television serials in antagonist roles.

Background

Priya hails from Teynampet, Tamil Nadu. She was noted for her performance in the Malayalam film Ninnishtam Ennishtam in 1986. She is married to David, a cinematographer of Malayalam movies. The couple have a son, Prince and a daughter, Aishwarya.

Partial filmography

Malayalam

 Saahasam (1981)
 Priyasakhi Radha (1982)
  Enganeyundashane (1984) as Dancer
  Boeing Boeing(1985) as Dancer
  Adiverukal (1986) as Selvi
  Prathyekam Sradhikkuka (1986) as Sophia
  Snehamulla Simham (1986) as Lathika
  Ninnishtam Ennishtam (1986) as Shalini
  Padayani (1986) as Rajini
  Pappan Priyappetta Pappan (1986) as Dancer
  Shobaraj (1986) as Julie
  Gandhinagar Second Street (1986)
  Geetham (1986) as Lekha
  Sukhamo Devi (1986) as Dr. Ambikadmajan Nair's wife
  Dheem Tharikada Thom (1986) as Suresh's wife
  Aval Kaathirunnu Avanum (1986)
  Mazha Peyyunnu Maddalam Kottunnu (1986) as Aruna
  Ente Sonia (1986)
  Ivare Sookshikkuka (1987)
  Ayitham (1987) as Kasthuri
  Archanappookkal (1987) as Sumithra
 January Oru Orma (1987)
  Oohakkachavadam (1988) as Naseema
  Oru Vivaada Vishayam (1988) as Yamunadevi
  Chaaravalayam (1988) as Thumbi
  Moonnam Mura (1988) as Ali Imran's sister
  Aryan (1988) as Savithri
  Samvalsarangal (1988)
  Mrigaya (1989) as Yashodha
  Jeevitham Oru Raagam (1989) as Sharada
  Mukham (1989) as Prema
  Kaalalppada (1989) as IAS Officer's wife (Ponnu Chakkara)
  Pooram (1989) as Sushamma
  Varum Varathikkilla (1989) as Sumithra
  Krooran (1989)
  Kaliyuga Seetha (1989)
  Rajavazhcha (1990) as Aleykutty
  Malootty (1990) 
  Niyamam Enthucheyyum (1990) as Priya
  Kadathanadan Ambadi (1990) as Unichara's daughter
  Wait a Minute (1990)
  Kaumaara Swapnangal (1991)
  Ninneyum Thedi (2001) 
  Njan Rajavu (2002) as Rose Mary
  Miss Suvarna (2002)
  Manivarnathooval (2002)
  Ninnishtam Ennishtam 2 (2011) as Shalini(Chikku)
  Vaidooryam (2012) 
  Manthrikan (2012) as
  Gramam (2012) as Nechumu/Lakshmiyamma
  Police Maman (2013) as Celina
  Dum Biriyani (2015)

Tamil
 Naalu Perukku Nandri (1983) as Uncredited role
 Pozhuthu Vidinchachu (1984) as Dancer 
 Chinna Veedu (1985)
 Unakkaga Oru Roja (1985)
 Solla Thudikkuthu Manasu (1988) as Jaya / Thenmozhi
 Kunguma Kodu (1988)
 Nyaya Tharasu (1989)
 Velai Kidaichuduchu (1990)
 Nalla Kaalam Porandaachu (1990) as Rosy
 Gnana Paravai (1991)
 Pathavi Pramanam (1994)
 Bombay (1995)
 Thirutham (2007) as Velmurugan's mother
 Thee Nagar (2007) 
 Anjathe (2008) as Sathyavan's mother
 Thodakkam (2008)
 Mayandi Kudumbathar as Azhagamma (2009)
 Namma Gramam (2014)
 Motta Shiva Ketta Shiva (2017)

Hindi
 Gulabi Raaten (1990) 
 Platform (1993)  
 Raja Rani's Love in Jungle (1995)   
 Krishna (1996)  
 Chachi 420 (1997) 
 Khakee (2004) 
 Tum - A Dangerous Obsession (2004)

Kannada
Yuddha Kaanda (1989)
Agnisakshi (1998)

Telugu
 Vijrumbhana (1986)
 Shiva (1989)

Television

References

External links

Tamil television actresses
Actresses in Tamil television
Actresses in Malayalam cinema
Actresses from Chennai
Indian film actresses
20th-century Indian actresses
21st-century Indian actresses
Living people
Indian television actresses
Actresses in Malayalam television
Actresses in Telugu television
Actresses in Kannada cinema
Actresses in Tamil cinema
Actresses in Hindi cinema
Year of birth missing (living people)